Grand-Hornu is an old industrial coal mining complex and company town (cité ouvrière) in Hornu (Boussu), near Mons, in Belgium. It was built by Henri De Gorge between 1810 and 1830. It is a unique example of functional town-planning. Today it is owned by the province of Hainaut, which houses temporary exhibitions in the buildings. It is one of the four industrial sites which were listed by UNESCO as a World Heritage Site in 2012

External links

Official website
Grand-Hornu at 365.be

Wallonia's Major Heritage
Buildings and structures in Hainaut (province)
Mines in Belgium
Museums in Hainaut (province)
Art museums and galleries in Belgium
World Heritage Sites in Belgium
Company towns